Cheekkilode is a village in Kozhikode district in the state of Kerala, India surrounded by Kolathur on the northern side, Kolakkad on West, Kakkur-Nanmanda on East and Annassery - Chelannur on East. Olayimmal is at the centre place of Cheekkilode which is a market place. Olayimmal is the nerve centre of Cheekkilode from where buses are plying to different places like Kozhikode, Balussery, Ulliyeri, Koyilandi,  etc. Kuttiyadi-Calicut irrigation canal passes through Cheekkilode - olayimmal. Some of the  places of interest are Karimkaali Kavu, Vallikkattukavil, Padinjare veluthedathu Bhuvaneshwari temple, Adumbummal Bhagavathi temple, Pilakkuttiyedath Makham, Kolathur temple, Kandankulangara temple, Ongorappara Pukkunnumala and Eliyodu mala.

Kappad - Thushara giri highway goes through Cheekkilode village and connects National highway No. 66 at Thiruvangoor. Cheekkilode village is situated in between Atholi and Nanminda.  The nearest airports are at Kozhikode International Airport Kozhikode and Kannur International Airport [Kannur]. The nearest railway station is at Koyilandi.

References

Kuttiady area